Crawford's Plantation House is a plantation house on Edisto Island, South Carolina of architectural significance. The building reflects an antebellum Greek Revival Sea Island cotton plantation. Between 1889 and 1899, one-story polygonal projections at the front were added. An earlier porch was replaced in the twentieth century, and the back porch has been enclosed. The plantation was listed in the National Register on June 8, 1993.

References

National Register of Historic Places in Charleston County, South Carolina
Houses on the National Register of Historic Places in South Carolina
Houses in Charleston County, South Carolina